Thitarodes pratensis is a species of moth of the family Hepialidae. It was described by Yang, Li and Shen in 1992, and is known from Yunnan, China.

References

External links
Hepialidae genera

Moths described in 1992
Hepialidae